Sulaiman bin Daud (Jawi: سليمان بن داود; 4 March 1933 – 23 March 2010) was a Malaysian politician who held seven cabinet posts in the Malaysian government between 1981 and 1999, including as Federal Minister of Education. He represented the constituency of Santubong (1974 - 1990) and Petra Jaya (1990 - 2004) in the Parliament of Malaysia and was a member of the Parti Pesaka Bumiputera Bersatu (PBB) in the Barisan Nasional (BN) coalition. He was Chancellor of the International Medical University from 2005 to 2010.

Sulaiman was born in Kuching, Sarawak and was a dentist including in the government hospital in Kuala Belait, Brunei before entering politics. He graduated from the University of Otago in New Zealand. He died aged 77 of liver cancer at the Kuala Lumpur Hospital on 23 March 2010, survived by four children.

In 2018, a bridge on Matang-Stapok in Sarawak named as 'Sulaiman Daud Bridge' in honour of him.

Honours
  :
  Commander of the Order of Loyalty to the Crown of Malaysia (PSM) - Tan Sri (2000)
  :
  Companion of the Most Exalted Order of the Star of Sarawak (JBS)
  Knight Commander of the Most Exalted Order of the Star of Sarawak (PNBS) - formerly Dato', now Dato Sri
  Knight Commander of the Order of the Star of Hornbill Sarawak (DA) - Datuk Amar (1991)
  :
  Grand Knight of the  Order of the Crown of Pahang (SIMP) - formerly Dato', now Dato' Indera (1985)
  :
  Knight Companion of the Order of Sultan Salahuddin Abdul Aziz Shah (DSSA) - Dato' (1992)

References

1933 births
2010 deaths
Deaths from cancer in Malaysia
Deaths from liver cancer
People from Kuching
Malaysian Muslims
Members of the Dewan Rakyat
Government ministers of Malaysia
Agriculture ministers of Malaysia
Education ministers of Malaysia
Justice ministers of Malaysia
Academic staff of the International Medical University
University of Otago alumni
Knights Commander of the Most Exalted Order of the Star of Sarawak
Knights Commander of the Order of the Star of Hornbill Sarawak
Commanders of the Order of Loyalty to the Crown of Malaysia